The Minister of Foreign Affairs (or simply, the Foreign Minister) is the head of the Ministry of Foreign Affairs of the Government of Nepal. One of the senior-most offices in the federal cabinet, the chief responsibility of the foreign minister is to represent Nepal and its government in the international community. The Foreign Minister also plays an important role in determining and implementing Nepalese foreign policy.

List of ministers 
This is a list of Ministers of Foreign Affairs of Nepal.

References

External links 
 Official Website of Ministry of Foreign Affairs

Nepal
Lists of government ministers of Nepal